The 2014 Formula Acceleration 1 season was a formula racing series that started over 25–27 April in Portimao, Portugal and ended over 17–19 October at the TT Circuit Assen, Netherlands. The series featured 12 teams that represented the nations in which they were founded. Their drivers did not have that nationality per sé, but the car  represented the flag. This concept was similar to the one used in the former A1 Grand Prix series, whose vehicles were used in FA1. To attract young, yet serious, racing drivers, the 2014 winning driver/team was promised the full budget for the 2015 FA1 season and a test day in a GP2 Series car in Abu Dhabi.

Formula Acceleration 1 (FA1) was the most prominent part of Acceleration 2014, a series of festivals combining top class car and bike racing with music and entertainment. Next to FA1, there was the MW-V6 Pickup Series, based on the former Dutch racing series BRL V6, the Legend SuperCup, based on legends car racing, and the European Stock 600 and 1000 Series, which featured motorcycle racing for 15- and 16-year-olds. As for the music, on Friday evenings, David Hasselhoff hosted "Celebrate the 80's and the 90's with The Hoff", a dance party featuring 2 Unlimited, Haddaway, Kim Wilde, and others. Saturday evenings saw  performances from international DJs.

The championship was dominated by Nigel Melker and Mirko Bortolotti, taking eight of the ten race victories between them. Melker clinched the championship title after Bortolotti skipped the final round at Assen. Third place in the championship went to Richard Gonda, who achieved a trio of podium finishes but without victory. Indeed, the only other driver to take a race victory besides Melker and Bortolotti was Felix Rosenqvist, who completed a double at Monza; he finished the season in fifth place, three points behind Sebastian Balthasar. Netherlands won the nations' championship by 10.5 points ahead of Italy.

On 22 December 2014, it was announced that the series would be merged with Auto GP in 2015, to ensure that at least 18 cars will participate in each race. It was also announced that the 2015 champion will be granted a Formula One test.

Calendar
The 2014 calendar consisted of five race weekends. Originally, nine were planned. However, Acceleration in Zolder, Acceleration at Paul Ricard, and Acceleration at Grobnik were cancelled on 27 June 2014 and Acceleration at Hungaroring was cancelled on 20 August 2014.

Race format

Entrants

Notes
 Portimao: Picho Toledano was entered for the inaugural weekend but withdrew due to technical problems without competing in a session.
 Navarra: Nathanaël Berthon replaced Sergio Campana at Acceleration Team France. Campana replaced Armando Parente and drove for Portugal, while Parente joined the Chinese team. Oliver Campos-Hull therefore moved to Team Spain, replacing Victor Garcia. Finally, the Danish-born Dennis Lind took Felix Rosenqvist's seat at the Swedish team.
 Nürburgring: Alessio Picariello replaced Nathanaël Berthon at Acceleration Team France. Jimmy Eriksson replaced Dennis Lind at the Swedish team. Lind moved to Acceleration Team Venezuela, replacing Rodolfo González.
 Monza: Marco Barba replaced Oliver Campos-Hull at Acceleration Team Spain. Felix Rosenqvist came back to the Swedish team, taking over from Jimmy Eriksson. Steijn Schothorst made his debut for Acceleration Team China, run by the Venezuelan Team Lazarus, which also employed Dennis Lind for the race.
 Assen: Nathanaël Berthon drove for China. Italy entered two cars, for Gian Maria Gabbiani and Sergio Campana, who was replaced by Dutchman Jeroen Mul at Acceleration Team Portugal. The Swede Kevin Kleveros took over from Picho Toledano and Craig Dolby drove for Sweden instead of Felix Rosenqvist. Acceleration Team Netherlands also entered a second car for Bas Schouten, who previously entered MW-V6. Finally, Acceleration Team United Kingdom entered this race with Dani Clos at the wheel.

Technical specifications
All cars were mechanically identical and were built with reducing costs in mind, which led to an approximate price for the whole season of €450,000. FA1 used the Lola B05/52, used in A1 Grand Prix between 2005 and 2008.

Engine: 3.4L V8 Zytek ZA1348
Horsepower: 550 hp
Chassis: carbon fibre and aluminium honeycomb
Wheelbase: 3,000 mm (118.1 in)
Weight: 698 kg (driver included)
Suspension: double wishbone suspension with push-rod
Dampers: Öhlins TT44 3-Way, adjustable
Gearbox: Xtrac, electronic, six gears
Brakes: AP calipers with four pistons, steel discs
Tyres: Michelin

Championship standings

Scoring system
Points were awarded to the top 10 drivers in both races, regardless of whether the driver finished or not. The pole-sitter for each race received one point, and one point was also given to the driver who set the fastest lap in each race. At the end of the season, the FA1 Drivers' title was awarded to the driver with the highest number of points. There was also a Nations' championship, which grouped the represented nations by totalling the average of the points scored by the drivers of the same nationality (e.g.: with 5 Dutch drivers competing in a race, the Netherlands scored in that race the addition of the points scored by each driver divided by 5).

Sprint race points

Feature race points

Drivers' championship

Teams' championship

References

External links
 

Acceleration 2014
2014 in European sport
Acceleration 1